The Eagle Bluff Light, also known as Eagle Bluff lighthouse, or simply Eagle Bluff, is a lighthouse located near Ephraim in Peninsula State Park in Door County, Wisconsin. Construction was authorized in 1866, but the lighthouse was not actually built until 1868 at a cost of $12,000. It was automated in 1926. Restoration work began on the Eagle Bluff Light in 1960 and was completed in 1963, upon completion the Lighthouse was opened for tours. The lighthouse was added to the National Register of Historic Places in 1970.

Geography 
Located in what is modern-day Peninsula State Park. Situated on a 76-foot bluff that overlooks the Strawberry Channel, Eagle Bluff's mission is to illuminate the islands located in the middle of the strawberry channel. This mission is what gives Eagle Bluff its nickname "The Guardian of the Strawberry Channel".

Much of Door County is located on the Niagara Escarpment, the escarpment makes it very hard to dig into the soil of Door County, for this reason it is very usual to have a basement in Door County. Eagle Bluff has two basements. One under the tower and one under the keeper's residence.

Door County Historical Society 
The Door County Historical Society, also known as DCHS, has maintained the Eagle Bluff Light from 1960 to the present day. DCHS was responsible for the restoration of Eagle Bluff. These restorations were led by a woman known as Ida Bay. Currently DCHS is raising money to reconstruct the barn, and the summer kitchen that were originally located on the property. To this day DCHS runs tours through the keeper's residence and the tower of Eagle Bluff.

Keepers of the Light 
There were three keepers who maintained the Eagle Bluff Light: Henry Stanley, William Duclon, and Peter Coughlin.

Henry Stanley (1868–1883)

William Duclon (1883–1918) 
The longest serving keeper in Eagle Bluff's history, William Duclon and his wife Julia Duclon (née Davenport) raised their seven sons in this lighthouse. Eagle Bluff has been restored to the time period of the Duclons, some of their original possessions can be seen on display in the home today.

The youngest son of William and Julia, Walter Duclon, helped with the restorations of Eagle Bluff. He provided personal stories, artifacts, and family documents to help aid in the creation of the museum that is now housed in the keeper's residence.

Peter Coughlin (1918–1926)

Gallery

Further reading

 Havighurst, Walter (1943) The Long Ships Passing: The Story of the Great Lakes, Macmillan Publishers.
 Oleszewski, Wes, Great Lakes Lighthouses, American and Canadian: A Comprehensive Directory/Guide to Great Lakes Lighthouses, (Gwinn, Michigan: Avery Color Studios, Inc., 1998) .
 
 Sapulski, Wayne S., (2001) Lighthouses of Lake Michigan: Past and Present (Paperback) (Fowlerville: Wilderness Adventure Books) ; .
 Wright, Larry and Wright, Patricia, Great Lakes Lighthouses Encyclopedia Hardback (Erin: Boston Mills Press, 2006) .

References

External links
Eagle Bluff Lighthouse Museum - official website
Door County Lighthouses, Door County Marine Museum.
Eagle Bluff Light entry in Seeing the Light (Archived May 9, 2021)
Lighthouse friends article
NPS Inventory of Historic Light Stations - Wisconsin (Archived June 12, 2012)

Lighthouses completed in 1868
Houses completed in 1868
Lighthouses in Door County, Wisconsin
Lighthouses on the National Register of Historic Places in Wisconsin
Museums in Door County, Wisconsin
Lighthouse museums in Wisconsin
National Register of Historic Places in Door County, Wisconsin